Isthmian Oration may refer to:

 Diogenes or the Isthmian Oration, Oration 9 by Dio Chrysostom
 Isthmian Oration on Poseidon, Oration 46 by Aelius Aristides